Mohitnagar railway station is a small railway station in  Jalpaiguri district, West Bengal. Its code is MOP. The station consists of 1 platform. The platform is not well sheltered. It lacks many facilities including water and sanitation.

References

External links
 
 

Katihar railway division
Railway stations in Jalpaiguri district
Transport in Jalpaiguri
Year of establishment missing